is an American meditation teacher. He leads residential and phone-based meditation retreats for students interested in learning the Vipassana (insight) tradition of Buddhism. Shinzen was originally ordained in Japan as a monk in the Shingon (Japanese Vajrayana) tradition.  He has studied and practiced extensively in other traditions, including Zen and Native American traditions.

He frequently uses concepts from mathematics as a metaphor to illustrate the abstract concepts of meditation.  As a result, his teachings tend to be popular among academics and professionals. His interest in integrating meditation with scientific paradigms has led to collaborations with neuroscientists at Harvard Medical School, University of Massachusetts Medical School, Yale, Carnegie Mellon, and the University of Vermont. He is working on various ways to bring a secular mindfulness practice to a wider audience using revamped terminology and techniques as well as automated expert systems.

Shinzen has adapted the central Buddhist concept of the five skandhas or aggregates into modern language, grouped them into sensory categories with potential neurological correlates, and developed an extensive system of meditation techniques for working with those categories individually and in combinations.

Personal life
Shinzen Young was born as Steve Young in Los Angeles, California. His parents were Jewish. While in middle school, he became fascinated with Asian languages and cultures. After graduating from UCLA as an Asian Language major, he enrolled in the University of Wisconsin's Ph.D. program in Buddhist Studies. In order to gather materials for his doctoral dissertation, he was ordained as a Shingon monk at Mount Kōya, Japan in 1970.

Books 

Break Through Pain: A Step-by-Step Mindfulness Meditation Program for Transforming Chronic and Acute Pain (2006) 
The Beginner's Guide to Meditation (2002) 
The Science of Enlightenment: How Meditation Works (2016)

Audio publications 

The Science of Enlightenment (2005) 
Pain Relief (2004) 
Beginner's Mind: 3 Classic Meditation Practices Especially for Beginners (1999) 
Break Through Difficult Emotions: How to Transform Painful Feelings With Mindfulness Meditation (1997) 
Break Through Pain: How to Relieve Pain Using Powerful Meditation Techniques (1997) 
Meditation in the Zone: How to Turn Your Workout into a High-Quality Meditation (1996) 
Five Classic Meditations: Mantra, Vipassana, Karma Yoga, Loving Kindness, Kabbalah (1990)  (2004)

References

External links

Essays outlining his meditation system 
 What is Mindfulness?
 An Introduction to ULTRA: Universal Library for Training Attention
 See, Hear, Feel: An introduction
 An Outline of Practice
 Five Ways to Know Yourself: An Introduction to Basic Mindfulness

Living people
Theravada Buddhist spiritual teachers
American Buddhists
Converts to Buddhism from Judaism
American writers
Buddhist writers
Writers from Los Angeles
Year of birth missing (living people)
21st-century American Buddhists